Igor Mitreski (born 19 February 1979) is a Macedonian former professional footballer who played as a defender.

Club career 
Mitreski was born in Struga. In early 2005, he was recognized as a feature member to Bayern Munich and later was near to sign for Portsmouth. On 6 November he was suspended from the first team from Energie Cottbus. On 9 January 2009, he was loaned out to the Belgian team Germinal Beerschot.

One year later, in January 2010, Bulgarian CSKA Sofia signed Mitreski to a two-year deal for a €300,000.

Mitreski and CSKA Sofia mutually agreed to terminate Mitreski's contract as he was no longer in their plans and Mitreski no longer had the desire to play for CSKA Sofia.

Mitreski signed a two-year deal with Neftchi Baku from Azerbaijan on 9 July 2010.

International career 
Mitreski made his debut for the Macedonian national team in 2001 in a friendly game against the Czech Republic, and has earned 70 caps in which he scored one goal. His final international was an October 2011 European Championship qualification match against Armenia.

Career statistics

Honours 
Spartak Moscow
 Russian Premier League: 2001
 Russian Cup: 2003

Neftchi Baku
 Azerbaijan Premier League: 2010–11, 2011–12, 2012–13
 Azerbaijan Cup: 2012–13

References

External links
Profile at MacedonianFootball.com 
 

1979 births
Living people
Sportspeople from Struga
Association football defenders
Macedonian footballers
North Macedonia international footballers
FK Sileks players
FC Spartak Moscow players
FC Metalurh Zaporizhzhia players
Beitar Jerusalem F.C. players
FC Energie Cottbus players
Beerschot A.C. players
PFC CSKA Sofia players
Neftçi PFK players
Macedonian First Football League players
Russian Premier League players
Ukrainian Premier League players
Israeli Premier League players
Bundesliga players
Belgian Pro League players
2. Bundesliga players
First Professional Football League (Bulgaria) players
Azerbaijan Premier League players
Macedonian expatriate footballers
Expatriate footballers in Israel
Expatriate footballers in Germany
Expatriate footballers in Belgium
Expatriate footballers in Bulgaria
Expatriate footballers in Ukraine
Expatriate footballers in Russia
Expatriate footballers in Azerbaijan
Macedonian expatriate sportspeople in Israel
Macedonian expatriate sportspeople in Germany
Macedonian expatriate sportspeople in Belgium
Macedonian expatriate sportspeople in Bulgaria
Macedonian expatriate sportspeople in Ukraine
Macedonian expatriate sportspeople in Russia
Macedonian expatriate sportspeople in Azerbaijan